Trida barberae, or Barber's ranger, is a species of butterfly in the family Hesperiidae. It is found in southern Africa, from the Cape Province to Zimbabwe, Lesotho, Transvaal, the Free State and KwaZulu-Natal.

The wingspan is 26–33 mm for males and 29–38 mm for females. The subspecies T. b. bunta has only one generation per year, with adults on wing in September. The other two subspecies are on wing from October to November and from February to April in two generations.

The larvae feed on Imperata cylindrica.

Subspecies
Trida barberae barberae — south-western Tanzania, Zambia, eastern Zimbabwe, Eswatini, Lesotho, South Africa: Limpopo Province, Mpumalanga, North West Province, Gauteng, Free State Province, KwaZulu-Natal, Eastern Cape Province
Trida barberae bonsa Evans, 1956 — dry grassland of north-western East Cape and south-eastern North Cape
Trida barberae bunta Evans, 1956 — in fynbos on coastal dunes on the Cape Peninsula and the Cape Flats as well as the West Cape

References

External links

Butterflies described in 1873
Butterflies of Africa
Taxa named by Roland Trimen